Sarang Buaya or Kampung Sarang Buaya is a tourist village in Semerah, Muar District, Johor, Malaysia. It hosts a crocodile sanctuary across the Sarang Buaya River.

See also
  Sarang Buaya River

References

External links
Ministry of Tourism Malaysia :  Homestay Kampung Sarang Buaya Muar

Villages in Johor
Towns, suburbs and villages in Muar
Muar District